A lihapiirakka (literally "meat pie") is an everyday Finnish food sold in supermarkets and often available ready-to-eat as street food. It is a form of savoury pie or turnover made from doughnut dough and filled with a mixture of minced meat and cooked rice and cooked by deep frying. It does not resemble a traditional English or American meat pie or turnover because it is made of doughnut mix and is deep fried. They are usually bought ready cooked and are simply reheated in a microwave oven.

A larger and thicker form is also known as a möttönen. Two variants from Lappeenranta are atomi and vety ("atom" and "hydrogen"), where atomi contains either ham or egg, and vety includes both.

Traditionally the pastry is eaten whole. A contemporary way to have them is to split it in half and fill it with a frankfurter or some other type of sausage, or with kebab meat or some form of meat burger. They are generally served with ketchup, mustard and a relish similar to Bostongurka.

The term lihapiirakka may also be used for a large rectangular turnover.

See also 
 List of doughnut varieties
 List of fried dough varieties 
 Lörtsy
 Kalakukko

References

External links
Glossary of Finnish dishes 

Finnish cuisine
Savoury pies
Doughnuts
Meat dishes
Stuffed dishes